Cyrtandra decurrens is a species of flowering plant in the family Gesneriaceae, native to Borneo, the Moluccas, and New Guinea. Local people use its leaves in their cuisine in a manner similar to sorrel.

Subtaxa
The following variety is accepted:
Cyrtandra decurrens var. decurrens – Moluccas

References

decurrens
Flora of Borneo
Flora of the Maluku Islands
Flora of New Guinea
Plants described in 1856
Taxa named by Willem Hendrik de Vriese